Jean-Barthélémy Camille Polonceau (29 October 1813 – 21 September 1859) was a French railway systems engineer. He was born in Chambery, France, and died in the French commune Viry-Chatillon.

In 1839 he invented the Polonceau truss, a method of roof construction considered "one of the most successful roof designs of the nineteenth century".

Polonceau's name is one of the 72 names on the Eiffel Tower.

References

1813 births
1859 deaths
French engineers